Melissa McMorrow Ramalho (born June 19, 1981) is an American professional boxer and architect. She is a former two time WBO female flyweight champion, having held the title from 2012 to 2013 and again in 2015, and held the WIBF flyweight title from 2012 to 2013. She has also challenged for the WBA interim female flyweight title in 2012 and the WBC female flyweight title in 2018.

Professional boxing record

References

External links
 
Melissa McMorrow - Architect / SolarCity Spotlight.

1981 births
Living people
Sportspeople from Palo Alto, California
American women boxers
World boxing champions
World flyweight boxing champions
Flyweight boxers
Boxers from California